Murzagulovo (Mırźağol) is a rural locality (a village) in Kysylsky Selsoviet, Alsheyevsky District, Bashkortostan, Russia. The population was 85 as of 2010. There are 4 streets.

Geography 
Murzagulovo is located 61 km southeast of Rayevsky (the district's administrative centre) by road. Konstantinogradovka is the nearest rural locality.

References 

Rural localities in Alsheyevsky District